The House of Oldenburg is a German dynasty with links to Denmark since the 15th century. It has had branches that rule or have ruled in Denmark, Iceland, Greece, Norway, Russia, Sweden, the United Kingdom, Schleswig, Holstein, and Oldenburg. The current Queen of Denmark, King of Norway and King of the United Kingdom are all patrilineal descendants of the Glücksburg branch of this house.

The dynasty rose to prominence when Count Christian I of Oldenburg was elected as King of Denmark in 1448, of Norway in 1450 and of Sweden in 1457. The house has occupied the Danish throne ever since.

History 

Count Elimar I was first mentioned in 1091. The ancestral home of the family is Oldenburg Castle. In the 12th century, Rastede Monastery near Oldenburg became their house monastery and later their country seat to this day. Marriages of medieval counts of Oldenburg paved the way for their heirs to become kings of various Scandinavian kingdoms.  Through marriage with a descendant of King Valdemar I of Sweden and of King Eric IV of Denmark, a claim to Sweden and Denmark was staked as early as 1350.

At that time, its competitors were the successors of Margaret I of Denmark. In the 15th century, the Oldenburg heir of that claim married Hedwig of Schauenburg, a descendant of Euphemia of Sweden and Norway and also a descendant of Eric V of Denmark and Abel of Denmark. Since descendants better situated in genealogical charts died out, their son Christian (the abovementioned) became the king of all three kingdoms of the whole Kalmar Union. The House of Mecklenburg was its chief competitor regarding the Northern thrones, and other aspirants included the Duke of Lauenburg. Different Oldenburgine branches have reigned in several countries. The House of Oldenburg was briefly poised to claim the British thrones through the marriage of Queen Anne and Prince George of Denmark and Norway; however, due to the early deaths of all their children, the crown passed to the House of Hanover.

Main line
 Counts (1101–1773), Dukes (1773–1810) and Grand Dukes (1815–1918) of Oldenburg
 Kings of Denmark (1448–1863)
 Kings of Norway (1450–1814)
 Kings of Sweden (1457–64, 1497–1501 and 1520–21)
 Dukes of Schleswig (1460–1864) (divided among various rulers 1544-1721)
 Counts (1460–1574) and Dukes (1574-1864) of Holstein (divided among various rulers 1544-1773)

Branches
Kings of Denmark (1448–1863)
 Danneskiold-Samsøe (since 1695) ill.
Schleswig-Holstein-Sonderburg-Augustenburg, extinct in male line in 1931
 Dukes of Schleswig-Holstein (claimant in 1863, then titular dukes until 1931)
Schleswig-Holstein-Sonderburg-Glücksburg
 Dukes of Schleswig-Holstein (titular dukes since 1931)
 Kings and queens of Denmark (since 1863)
 Rosenborg (since 1914; nondynastic)
 Monpezat (since 2008/2023)
 King of Iceland (1918–44)
 Kings of the Hellenes (1863–1924, 1935–73)
 King of the United Kingdom and other Commonwealth Realms (since 2022)
 Kings of Norway (since 1905)
Schleswig-Holstein-Gottorp
 Dukes of Holstein-Gottorp (1544–1739)
Holstein-Gottorp-Romanov (commonly still called Romanov)
 Dukes of Holstein-Gottorp (1739–73)
 Emperors of Russia (1762 and 1796–1917)
Holstein-Gottorp (Swedish line), extinct
 Kings of Sweden (1751–1818)
 King of Norway (1814–18)
Holstein-Gottorp (Grand ducal line)
 Dukes (later grand dukes) of Oldenburg (1774–1918)

Family tree of the House of Oldenburg (Counts of Oldenburg)

Family tree of the House of Oldenburg (Kings of Denmark)

Line of succession
By agnatic primogeniture:
	
Frederick I of Denmark (1471–1533)
Christian III of Denmark (1503–1559)
John II, Duke of Schleswig-Holstein-Sonderburg (1545–1622)
Alexander, Duke of Schleswig-Holstein-Sonderburg (1573–1627)
August Philipp, Duke of Schleswig-Holstein-Sonderburg-Beck (1612–1675)
Frederick Louis, Duke of Schleswig-Holstein-Sonderburg-Beck (1653–1728)
Peter August, Duke of Schleswig-Holstein-Sonderburg-Beck (1697–1775)
Prince Karl Anton August of Schleswig-Holstein-Sonderburg-Beck (1727–1759)
Friedrich Karl Ludwig, Duke of Schleswig-Holstein-Sonderburg-Beck (1757–1816)
Friedrich Wilhelm, Duke of Schleswig-Holstein-Sonderburg-Glücksburg (1785–1831)
 Friedrich, Duke of Schleswig-Holstein-Sonderburg-Glücksburg (1814–1885)
 Friedrich Ferdinand, Duke of Schleswig-Holstein (1855–1934)
 Wilhelm Friedrich, Duke of Schleswig-Holstein (1891–1965)
 Peter, Duke of Schleswig-Holstein (1922–1980)
 Christoph, Prince of Schleswig-Holstein (born 1949)
 (1) Friedrich Ferdinand, Hereditary Prince of Schleswig-Holstein (b. 1985)
 (2) Prince Constantin of Schleswig-Holstein (b. 1986)
 (3) Prince Leopold of Schleswig-Holstein (b. 1991)
 (4) Prince Alexander of Schleswig-Holstein (b. 1953)
 (5) Prince Julian of Schleswig-Holstein (b. 1997)
 Christian IX of Denmark (1818–1906)
 Frederick VIII of Denmark (1843–1912)
 Christian X of Denmark (1870–1947)
 Knud, Hereditary Prince of Denmark (1900–1976)
 (6) Count Ingolf of Rosenborg (b. 1940)
 Haakon VII of Norway (1872–1957)
 Olav V of Norway (1903–1991)
 (7) Harald V of Norway (b. 1937)
 (8) Haakon, Crown Prince of Norway (b. 1973)
 (9) Prince Sverre Magnus of Norway (b. 2005)
 Prince Harald of Denmark (1876–1949)
 Count Oluf of Rosenborg (1923–1990)
 (10) Count Ulrik Harald Gunnar Oluf of Rosenborg (b. 1950)
 (11) Count Philip Oluf Axel Ulrik of Rosenborg (b. 1986)
 George I of Greece (1845–1913)
 Constantine I of Greece (1868–1923)
 Paul of Greece (1901–1964)
 Constantine II of Greece (1940–2023)
 (12) Pavlos, Crown Prince of Greece (b. 1967)
 (13) Prince Constantine Alexios of Greece and Denmark (b. 1998)
 (14) Prince Achileas Andreas of Greece and Denmark (b. 2000)
 (15) Prince Odysseas Kimon of Greece and Denmark (b. 2004)
 (17) Prince Aristide Stavros of Greece and Denmark (b. 2008)
 (17) Prince Nikolaos of Greece and Denmark (b. 1969)
 (18) Prince Philippos of Greece and Denmark (b. 1986)
 Prince Andrew of Greece and Denmark (1882–1944)
 Prince Philip, Duke of Edinburgh (1921–2021)
 (19) Charles III (b. 1948)
 (20) William, Prince of Wales (b. 1982)
 (21) Prince George of Wales (b. 2013)
 (22) Prince Louis of Wales (b. 2018)
 (23) Prince Harry, Duke of Sussex (b. 1984)
 (24) Archie Mountbatten-Windsor (b. 2019)
 (25) Prince Andrew, Duke of York (b. 1960)
 (26) Prince Edward, Duke of Edinburgh (b. 1964)
 (27) James, Earl of Wessex (b. 2007)
 Prince Christopher of Greece and Denmark (1888–1940)
 (28) Prince Michael of Greece and Denmark (b. 1939)
 Prince Valdemar of Denmark (1858–1939)
 Prince Axel of Denmark (1888–1964)
 Count Flemming Valdemar of Rosenborg (1922–2002)
 (29) Count Axel of Rosenborg (b. 1950)
 (30) Count Carl Johan of Rosenborg (b. 1979)
 (31) Count Alexander Flemming of Rosenborg (b. 1993)
 (32) Count Birger of Rosenborg (b. 1950)
 (33) Count Carl Johan of Rosenborg (b. 1952)
 Prince Erik, Count of Rosenborg (1890–1950)
 Count Christian Edward of Rosenborg (1932–1997)
 (34) Count Valdemar Christian of Rosenborg (b. 1965)
 (35) Count Nicolai Christian Valdemar of Rosenborg (b. 1997)
 Adolf, Duke of Holstein-Gottorp (1526–1586)
 John Adolf, Duke of Holstein-Gottorp (1575–1616)
 Frederick III, Duke of Holstein-Gottorp (1597–1659)
 Christian Albert, Duke of Holstein-Gottorp (1641–1695)
 Frederick IV, Duke of Holstein-Gottorp (1671–1702)
 Charles Frederick, Duke of Holstein-Gottorp (1700–1739)
 Peter III of Russia (1728–1762)
 Paul I of Russia (1728–1762)
 Nicholas I of Russia (1796-1855)
 Alexander II of Russia (1818-1881)
 Grand Duke Paul Alexandrovich of Russia (1860-1919)
 Grand Duke Dmitri Pavlovich of Russia (1891-1941)
 Prince Paul Dimitrievich Romanovsky-Ilyinsky (1928-2004)
 (36) Prince Dimitri Pavlovich Romanovsky-Ilyinsky (b. 1954)
 (37) Prince Michael Pavlovich Romanovsky-Ilyinsky (b. 1961)
 Prince George Alexandrovich Yurievsky (1872-1913)
 Prince Alexander Georgijevich Yurievsky (1900-1988)
 (not in line of succession as his grandfather Prince George was born out of wedlock) Prince George Alexandrovich Yurievsky (b. 1961)
 Grand Duke Michael Nicolaevich of Russia (1832-1909)
 Grand Duke Alexander Mikhailovich of Russia (1866-1933)
 Prince Andrew Alexandrovich of Russia (1897-1981)
 Prince Andrew Andreevich (1923-2021)
 (38) Prince Alexis Andreevich (b. 1953)
 (39) Prince Peter Andreevich (b. 1961)
 (40) Prince Andrew Andreevich (b. 1963)
 Prince Rostislav Alexandrovich of Russia (1902-1978)
 Prince Rostislav Rostislavovich (1938-1999)
 (41) Prince Rostislav Rostislavovich (b. 1985)
 (not in line of succession as he was born out of wedlock) Prince Rostislav Rostislavovich (b. 2013)
 (42) Prince Nikita Rostislavovich (b. 1987)
 Prince Nicholas Rostislavovich (1945-2000)
 (43) Prince Nicholas Nicolaevich (b. 1968)
 (44) Prince Daniel Nicolaevich (b. 1972)
 (45) Prince Jackson Daniel Danielaevich (b. 2009)
 Prince Christian August of Holstein-Gottorp (1673-1726)
 Prince Georg Ludwig of Holstein-Gottorp (1719-1763)
 Peter I, Grand Duke of Oldenburg (1755-1829)
 Augustus, Grand Duke of Oldenburg (1783-1853)
 Peter II, Grand Duke of Oldenburg (1827-1900)
 Frederick Augustus II, Grand Duke of Oldenburg (1852-1931)
 Nikolaus, Duke of Oldenburg (1897-1970)
 Anton Günther, Duke of Oldenburg (1923-2014)
 (46) Christian, Duke of Oldenburg (b. 1955) (47) Prince Alexander of Oldenburg (b. 1990)
 (48) Prince Philipp of Oldenburg (b. 1991)
 (49) Prince Anton Friedrich of Oldenburg (b. 1993)
 Prince Peter of Oldenburg (1926-2016) (50) Prince Friedrich August of Oldenburg (b. 1952)
 (51) Prince Nikolaus of Oldenburg (b. 1955)
 (52) Prince Christoph of Oldenburg (b. 1985)
 (53) Prince Georg of Oldenburg (b. 1990)
 (54) Prince Oscar of Oldenburg (b. 1991)
 (55) Prince Georg Moritz of Oldenburg (b. 1957)
 Prince Friedrich August of Oldenburg (1936–2017)''
 (56) Prince Paul-Wladimir of Oldenburg (b. 1969)
 (57) Prince Kirill of Oldenburg (b. 2002)
 (58) Prince Carlos of Oldenburg (b. 2004)
 (59) Prince Paul of Oldenburg (b. 2005)
 (60) Prince Louis of Oldenburg (b. 2012)
 (61) Prince Huno of Oldenburg (b. 1940)
 (62) Prince Johann of Oldenburg (b. 1940)
 (63) Prince Konstantin Nikolaus of Oldenburg (b. 1975)

Gallery

See also

Footnotes

References

External links 
 
 .

|-

|-

|-

|-